The Ababil-100 or al-Fat'h or al-Fatah was an Iraqi single stage solid propelled Short-range ballistic missile whose development project started around August 1991 and was tested from 2000 to 2002. It was derived from the Ababil-50 MLRS.

Development
During August 1991 Iraq started a program to develop the J-1 SSMs based on the S-75 Dvina SAM, later on structural similarities would be observed between the Fahad missiles that would later be released and the J-1 missiles. Iraq would then commence another program to develop a missile that could deleiver a 300 kg payload with a range of 150 km and a CEP of 150 m for guided Al-Fat'h and 750 m for unguided Al-Fat'h. By 1994 however the guided missiles programs would split and the solid-propellant one would retain its name of Ababil-100 however the liquid propelled version would later on become the Al-Samoud. The Ababil-100 would inherit many properties from the Ababil-50 MLRS developed in collaboration with Yugoslavia during the 1980s. Iraq had lacked the required material for the motor case as well as the airframe and thus encountered difficulties in forming and aligning cylindrical shapes required for motor cases resulting in decreased accuracy. Iraq also lacked mixers and bowls required for mixing the propellant as they had already been used for the Badr-2000 cruise missile project and thus frequency of motor accidents increased. Iraq had reportedly imported gyroscopes and accelerometers from Belarus for its guided version, it was estimated that the Inertial guidance system for the guided version would allow the missile to achieve a CEP of 150 m at 150 km range.

Characteristics
The Al Fat'h was a solid-propellant ballistic missile having a length of 6.7 m and a diameter of 0..5 m yet a 1.4 m diameter with fins. It weighed 1200 kg and utilized a motor weighing 770-856 kg and carried a payload mass of 260-300 kg with a 160-170 kg HE warhead and carried propellant weighing up to 828 kg. In the words of a UN inspector it was a "Badr-2000 Junior". The missile probably used the rocket engine of Condor-I (Alacran). The airframe was made of 4 mm thick 30CrMoV9 steel sheet. The Al-Fat'h missile was designed to be launched from the S-75 Dvina TEL and was mounted in a storage box with an integrated rail launcher. The unguided version was simply Fin stabilized however the guided version would use a complex system of Actuators and Canards with indigenous computers yet imported gyroscopes and accelerometers composing its INS. Although the HE warhead of this missile was the same as that used in the Al-Samoud missile however the submunition warhead was the KB-1 submunition which was used in Ababil-50, it operated a barometric fuze. The Unguided missile would carry 850-900 submunitions, each submunition weighing 30 g and the submunitions would be dispersed at the height of 2±0.5 km. The missiles range was greater than 150 km. The Al-Fat'h system had a high failure rate with 30% ending in failure and 10% of motors experiencing catastrophic failure during firing.

Operational history

The guided version was ready for testing just before the Iraq war however it could not be tested, the Iraqis also had a plan to extend the range of this missile to 200 km however this could not be achieved. 50 individual test firings took place between 2000 and 2002 in which 17 were static motor tests and 33 were flight tests. The unguided version failed to achieve the desired CEP of 750 m. During the Iraq War Iraq fired 12 to 16 of these missiles. The Maximum tested range of the missile was 161 km yet sources suggest that the real range was greater had the Coalition forces not intercepted the missile.

The Headquarters of the 2nd Brigade, US 3rd Infantry Division, were struck by an Ababil-100 missile on April 7, while the Brigade's main force was conducting an incursion 15 km north, well inside Baghdad. Three soldiers and two foreign reporters were killed in the blast. Another 14 soldiers were injured, and 22 vehicles destroyed or seriously damaged, most of them Humvees. The US air defenses were unable to detect and track the missile because its radar was oriented to the north.

References 

Tactical ballistic missiles of Iraq
Ballistic missiles of Iraq
Short-range ballistic missiles of Iraq
Surface-to-surface missiles of Iraq
Theatre ballistic missiles
Weapons and ammunition introduced in 2003